Buffalo Bill, Jr. is a half-hour western series that aired in syndication starting in March 1955. The last new episode was broadcast in September 1956. The series was produced by Gene Autry's Flying A Productions, and distributed by CBS Television Film Sales. The 42 episodes continued to be leased and broadcast via individual stations until at least 1961. In 1964 the ABC network began airing the series on Saturday mornings at 9:30 a.m.

Production
Gene Autry came up with the idea of doing a children's western about an old judge, a teenaged cowboy, and his little sister. Dick Jones was under contract to Autry's Flying A Productions, and was asked to play the young cowboy, even though he was 28 years old in 1955. Since childhood, Jones had worked at rodeos as a trick rider and roper, so he did his own stunts on the show.

The series was filmed at Pioneertown, and the original sponsors were Brown Shoe Company and Mars Candy. The western was sold to more than 100 markets.

Cast
Dick Jones as Buffalo Bill, Jr. 
Nancy Gilbert as Calamity
Harry Cheshire as Judge Ben “Fair and Square” Wiley

Guest stars include James Best as the town's telegraph operator. (One episode.) Some of the veteran actors who had guest roles are Denver Pyle, Glenn Strange and William Fawcett. One of Lee Van Cleef's early roles had him brawling with Bill, Jr. in the episode Boomer's Blunder.

Synopsis
After an Indian attack on a wagon train Judge Wiley finds two survivors, a boy and a girl, traveling through the Black Hills. The boy is carrying his younger sister, whom he had wrapped in a buffalo robe, so the judge called him Buffalo Bill, Jr. The judge considered the girl to be mischievous, so he called her Calamity.  Wiley adopts the children and raises them in Wileyville, a town that he founded. Besides being the town's judge Wiley also runs the general store, which has a courtroom inside of it. In addition, he is the town doctor, the sheriff,  the barber and the blacksmith.

Despite Wileyville being a remote small town Buffalo Bill, Jr. and his family have encounters with Geronimo, Billy the Kid, Johnny Ringo, Wyatt Earp, and members of Jesse James' outlaw gang. A TV Guide reviewer wrote that it is nothing for Buffalo Bill, Jr. "to leap from his galloping mount atop an outlaw riding at top speed, knock him to the ground and best him in a slugfest."

Episodes

Season 1 (1955-1956)

Season 2 (1956)

Series related merchandise

Promotional items
Sponsors helped promote the show by advertising series tie-ins. In 1955 children were given a free Buffalo Bill, Jr. ring with the purchase of a pair of shoes.  Also in 1955 an advertisement in Life magazine offered a "leatherlike" Buffalo Bill, Jr. belt, with a "silvery" buckle for 25 cents and three Milky Way candy wrappers.

Media
Dell Comics published a series of Buffalo Bill, Jr. comic books between the years of 1955 and 1959.

Western Publishing produced at least two Buffalo Bill, Jr. children's novels: The Brand Changers and The Buffalo Hunter, both from 1958.

View-Master produced a three-reel Buffalo Bill, Jr set.

References

1950s Western (genre) television series
First-run syndicated television programs in the United States
Black-and-white American television shows